The Antiterrorism and Effective Death Penalty Act of 1996 (AEDPA), was introduced to the United States Congress in April 1995 as a Senate Bill. The bill was passed with broad bipartisan support by Congress in response to the bombings of the World Trade Center and Oklahoma City. It was signed into law by President Bill Clinton.

Controversial for its changes to the law of habeas corpus in the United States, the AEDPA also contained a number of provisions to "deter terrorism, provide justice for victims, provide for an effective death penalty, and for other purposes."

Background 
On February 10, 1995, Senator Joe Biden introduced the Omnibus Counterterrorism Act of 1995 to the United States Senate. Just as was the case with its successor, the bill omnibus bill was introduced on behalf of the Clinton Administration. In the two months that the bill was debated in the Senate, little progress was made towards passage.

Following the Oklahoma City Bombing on April 19, 1995, a new antiterrorism bill was introduced to the Senate by Republican Senate Majority leader Bob Dole. The Antiterrorism and Effective Death Penalty Act of 1996 was introduced on April 27, 1995.

Legislative history 
Within days of the AEDPA being introduced, there were disagreements between Republican and Democratic leadership. Senator Dole proposed the addition of federal habeas corpus reform, which President Clinton was not opposed to as a standalone measure but which he did not want added to the AEDPA.

Although the bill was promoted as an urgent measure necessary to combat terrorism on American soil, the AEDPA was stalled in Congress by December of 1995. It would not see further Congressional activity until March of 1996.

When it passed in April 1996, the AEDPA was the result of above average levels of bipartisanship with the final vote in the Senate being 91-8 and in the House of Representatives 293-133.

Provisions

Title I - Habeas Corpus Reform 
Changes filing deadlines and limits appeals for death penalty cases. For more see Habeas Corpus.

Title II - Justice for Victims 
This section provides for mandatory victim restitution, alters jurisdiction for lawsuits against terrorist states, and expands assistance for victims of terrorism.

Title III - International Terrorism Prohibitions 
One of the sections included in the bill as originally introduced, this section received broad bipartisan support from the beginning. It prohibits international terrorist fundraising, gives authority to the Secretary of State to designate foreign organizations as terrorist organizations, allows criminal prosecution of anyone found to be providing funding to any organization linked to a designated terrorist organization. Prohibits assistance to terrorist states, including military aid and assistance from international financial institutions.

Title IV - Terrorist and Criminal Alien Removal and Exclusion 
Provides for the removal of alien terrorists, the exclusion of members and representatives of terrorist organizations, modifies asylum procedures to allow denial of asylum to members of terrorist organizations, and alters criminal procedures for aliens.

In altering the criminal procedures for aliens, the law created a new system of secret evidence which allows the government to introduce classified information as evidence without disclosing the specifics of the evidence to the alien or their legal counsel. It also expands the criteria for deportation for crimes of moral turpitude.

Title V - Nuclear, Biological, and Chemical Weapons Restrictions 
Defines and expands restrictions on certain types of nuclear materials, biological weapons, and chemical weapons.

Title VI - Implementation of Plastic Explosives Convention 
Codifies the plastic explosives convention requirement that all plastic explosives be equipped with detection agents and creates criminal sanctions for failure to comply.

Title VII - Criminal Law Modifications to Counter Terrorism 
Changes to criminal law involving terrorist (or explosives) offenses, including increased penalties and criminal procedures changes. Commissioning a study to determine the constitutionality of restrictions on bomb-making materials.

Title VIII - Assistance to Law Enforcement 
Provides additional resources and training for law enforcement including overseas training activities, additional requirements to preserve record evidence, and a commissioned study and report of electronic surveillance. Directed resources towards combatting international counterfeiting of U.S. currency, compiling statistics relating to the intimidation of government employees, and assessing and reducing the threat to law enforcement officers from the criminal use of firearms and ammunition. Also created the Commission on the Advancement of Federal Law Enforcement (Subtitle A).

Increased funding authorizations for law enforcement including the Federal Bureau of Investigation, Department of Justice, Immigration and Naturalization Service, and more.

Title IX - Miscellaneous 
Expanded the territorial sea, changed proof of citizenship requirements, and limited legal representation fees and expenses in capital cases.

Habeas corpus

AEDPA had a significant impact on the law of habeas corpus. Section 104(b)(3)(d) of the AEDPA limits the power of federal courts to grant habeas corpus relief to state prisoners, unless the state court's adjudication of the claim resulted in a decision that was 
contrary to, or involved an unreasonable application of clearly established federal law as determined by the US Supreme Court; or
based on an unreasonable determination of the facts in light of the evidence presented in the state court proceeding.

In addition to the modifications that pertain to all habeas corpus cases, AEDPA enacted special review provisions for capital cases from states that enacted quality controls for the performance of counsel in the state courts in the post-conviction phase. States that enacted the quality controls would see strict time limitations enforced against their death-row inmates in federal habeas proceedings coupled with extremely deferential review to the determinations of their courts regarding issues of federal law. Arizona became the first state to successfully opt-in to this provison in 2020.

Other provisions of AEDPA created entirely new statutory law. For example, the judicially-created abuse-of-the-writ doctrine, established in McCleskey v. Zant (1991), had restricted the presentation of new claims through subsequent habeas petitions. AEDPA replaced this doctrine with an absolute bar on second or successive petitions (sec. 105).

Petitioners in federal habeas proceedings that have already been decided in a previous habeas petition would find the claims barred. Additionally, petitioners who had already filed a federal habeas petition were required to first secure authorization from the appropriate federal court of appeals. Furthermore, AEDPA took away from the Supreme Court the power to review a court of appeals's denial of that permission, thus placing final authority for the filing of second petitions in the hands of the federal courts of appeals.

Court cases
Soon after it was enacted, AEDPA endured a critical test in the Supreme Court. The basis of the challenge was that the provisions limiting the ability of persons to file successive habeas petitions violated  Article I, Section 9, Clause 2, of the United States Constitution, the Suspension Clause. The Supreme Court held unanimously, in Felker v. Turpin, that the limitations did not unconstitutionally suspend the writ.

In 2005, the Ninth Circuit indicated that it was willing to consider a challenge to the constitutionality of AEDPA on separation of powers grounds under City of Boerne v. Flores and Marbury v. Madison, but it has since decided that the issue had been settled by circuit precedent.

Basketball player and later coach Steve Kerr and his siblings and mother sued the Iranian government under the Act for the 1984 killing of Kerr's father, Malcolm H. Kerr, in Beirut, Lebanon.

On June 21, 2022, the Supreme Court reinforced in Shoop v. Twyford that the power of federal courts to grant habeas corpus is restricted by AEDPA.

Reception
While the act has several titles and provisions, the majority of criticism stems  from the act's tightening of habeas corpus laws. Those in favor of the bill say that the act prevents those convicted of crimes from being able to "thwart justice and avoid just punishment by filing frivolous appeals for years on end", while critics argue that the inability to make multiple appeals increases the risk of an innocent person being killed.

Title IV also received criticism following the enactment of the AEDPA. The section allowing a single Immigration and Naturalization officer to decide whether to offer asylum to an individual who claims persecution but does not have identification was specifically targeted. The provision extending the ability of officers to deport anyone who illegally entered the country at any point in time without a hearing before a judge was also criticized.

Other, more recent criticism centers on the deference that the law requires of federal judges in considering habeas petitions. In Sessoms v. Grounds (Ninth Circuit), the majority of the judges believed that the state erred in not throwing out testimony made in the absence of the defendant's attorney after he had requested counsel, but they were required to overturn his appeal. The dissenting opinion said that federal courts can only grant habeas relief if "there is no possibility fair-minded jurists could disagree that the state court's decision conflicts with [the Supreme] Court's precedents".

In popular culture
On March 6, 2022, in the main segment of his show Last Week Tonight called Wrongful Convictions, John Oliver advocated for the abolition of AEDPA based on how difficult it makes it for convicts to appeal, by citing the cases of several wrongfully convicted individuals. He cited in particular Melissa Lucio, who is on death row in Texas for the murder of one of her children, which she claims was a household accident. She has been granted a stay of execution as the courts examine new evidence.

See also
 Illegal Immigration Reform and Immigrant Responsibility Act of 1996
 Immigration Act of 1990
 Anti-Drug Abuse Act of 1988

Notes and references

External links
Text of the Act, also in PDF
Timeline of Passage 
Antiterrorism and Effective Death Penalty Act of 1996: A Summary (broken link), Charles Doyle, American Law Division, Federation of American Scientists, June 3, 1996.

Acts of the 104th United States Congress
Terrorism laws in the United States
United States federal criminal legislation
Foreign sovereign immunity in the United States